The 18 Forrest Sherman-class destroyers comprised the first post-war class of US destroyers. Commissioned beginning in 1955, these ships served until the late 1980s. Their weaponry underwent considerable modification during their years of service. Four were converted to guided-missile destroyers. This class also served as the basis for the  guided-missile destroyers.

Two ships of the class became museum ships, nine were sunk in training exercises, and the others were scrapped.

Construction
Nine ships were constructed by Bath Iron Works of Bath, Maine, five were built by Bethlehem Steel at the Fore River Shipyard in Quincy, Massachusetts, two were built by Ingalls Shipbuilding at Pascagoula, Mississippi and two were built by Puget Sound Bridge and Dredging Company in Seattle, Washington. These destroyers were assigned hull numbers 931 to 951, but the series skipped over the numbers used to designate the war prizes DD-934 (the Japanese ex-Hanazuki), DD-935 (the German T35), and DD-939 (the German Z39). DD-927 to DD-930 were completed as destroyer leaders.

Description
Originally designed under project SCB 85, they were armed with three /54 caliber guns mounted in single turrets (one forward and two aft), 4 /50 caliber AA guns in twin mounts, as well as hedgehogs and torpedoes for ASW. However, over the years, weaponry was considerably modified. The hedgehogs and  guns were removed from all ships during the 1960s and 1970s. In addition the fixed torpedo tubes were replaced by two triple  Mark 32 torpedo tube mounts. 

 and later ships were built under SCB 85A with their fire control directors reversed from the SCB 85 configuration. They were equipped with B&W Bailey Meter Company's new automatic boiler combustion control system, and a modified hurricane bow/anchor configuration. These ships are listed as Hull-class destroyers in some references.

DDG conversions
Four of the destroyers—, and —were converted to guided-missile destroyers under SCB 240, armed with Tartar missiles.

ASW Modernization
Eight of the class were modernized to improve their ASW capabilities under SCB 251: Barry, Davis, Jonas Ingram, Manley, Du Pont, Blandy, Hull, and Morton; these ships became known as the Barry sub-class. These ships were fitted with an eight cell ASROC launcher in place of the No. 2 5-inch (127 mm) gun, and with a variable-depth sonar system. Six other ship modernizations were cancelled due to Vietnam War budget constraints.

8"/55 Mark 71 gun test
As a test platform, the Hull carried the Navy's prototype 8"/55 caliber Mark 71 light-weight gun from 1975 to 1978 when the program was canceled, and the 5-inch mount was restored. Hull remains the only modern (post–World War II) destroyer-type ship to have carried an  gun.

Disposition
Of the 18 completed, nine were disposed of in fleet training exercises, seven were sold by Defense Reutilization and Marketing Service (DRMS) for scrapping, and two became museums.

Ships in class

References

Notes

Sources

External links

Forrest Sherman-class destroyers at Destroyer History Foundation

 
Destroyer classes